Toledo Terminal Railroad was a railway company in the U.S. state of Ohio.  Primarily a switching railroad, it made a complete loop around the city of Toledo, crossing the Maumee River twice.

Track history
In its heyday, the TTR was double-tracked all the way around the city of Toledo, except for the portion around the Upper Maumee Bridge.

On March 17, 1982, a train derailed on the Upper Maumee Bridge, damaging it.  The Toledo Terminal elected not to fix the bridge, instead abandoning it, stirring up much controversy.

In 1983 it announced plans to lay continuous welded rail in north and west Toledo.

In January 2010, CSX Transportation petitioned to abandon the rest of the "Backside" of the Toledo Terminal (the portion on the west side of the Maumee River) from Temperance, on Toledo's north side, to a small portion just north of Norfolk Southern's Chicago Main, in Vulcan.  All of the removal track has since been completed, and plans are underway to turn the right-of-way into a rail trail.  This leaves only a small, inactive segment from the Vulcan to the ex-Wabash mainline near Gould on Toledo's south side.

The portion of the Toledo Terminal from Temperance to Bates, mainly the east of the Maumee River, is still in use by CSX.

Corporate history
The carrier was incorporated December 4, 1907, under the general laws of Ohio, for the purpose of acquiring the property, rights, and franchises formerly owned by The Toledo Railway and Terminal Company, which was done. The date of organization was December 4, 1907.

The carrier acquired by deed dated December 4, 1907, the property, rights, and franchises of the predecessor company, which had been sold at foreclosure sale on May 28, 1907. The latter was incorporated February 12, 1901, under the general laws of the State of Ohio.

Development of fixed physical property
The owned property of the carrier, comprising  of main-line railroad,  of second main track,  of yard tracks and sidings, a freight and passenger station, and certain other terminal facilities at Toledo, Ohio, was acquired partly by purchase after foreclosure proceedings, as previously explained, and partly by construction. The main-line mileage,  of yard tracks and sidings, the freight and passenger station, and certain other terminal facilities were constructed for The Toledo Railway and Terminal Company by The Toledo Railway and Terminal Construction Company during the years 1901, 1902, and 1903, and the entire line was opened for operation on October 1, 1903.

In addition to the foregoing, the carrier owns jointly with the Pere Marquette Railway Company  of yard tracks and sidings. It could not be determined from the records reviewed how this mileage was acquired.

Leased railway property
The carrier uses on date of valuation facilities owned by other companies and other companies use facilities owned by the carrier to the extent indicated in the statement below. The description of the property and the period and terms of use are as stated below. The rentals accrued and charged or credited to income for the year ending on date of valuation have not been ascertained.

Solely owned, but jointly used, used with—The Hocking Valley Railway Company—Tracks, between--

Walbridge and Boulevard Station, Toledo; for indefinite period from Sept. 1, 1913; stipulated payment 4½ cents per car-mile, with a minimum of $1.25 per train-mile.
Walbridge and Copeland, Toledo, Ohio; for indefinite period from Oct. 1, 1910; stipulated payment 4½ cents per car-mile, with a minimum of $1.25 per train-mile.
Walbridge and Consaul Street, Toledo; for indefinite period from July 1, 1914; stipulated payment 4½ cents per car-mile, with a minimum of $1.25 per train-mile.
Walbridge and Starr Avenue, Toledo, Ohio; term 25 years from Apr. 3, 1914; stipulated payment equal to interest at 2½ per cent on valuation of $142,707.83, plus a proportion, on wheelage basis, of maintenance, operation, and taxes.

The Cincinnati, Hamilton and Dayton Railway Company—Tracks, between—Bates and Boulevard Station, Toledo; for indefinite period from Oct. 1, 1911; stipulated payment 4½ cents per car-mile, with a minimum of $1.25 per train-mile.

The Toledo and Ohio Central Railway Company—Tracks, between—Stanley and Boulevard Station, Toledo; for indefinite period from Jan. 1, 1908; stipulated payment 4½ cents per car-mile, with a minimum of $1.25 per train-mile.

Hickox and Walbridge, for passenger trains; for indefinite period from Nov. 1, 1907; stipulated payment $1 per train-mile.

The Cleveland, Cincinnati, Chicago and St. Louis Railway Company—Tracks, between—Walbridge and Stanley; for passenger trains; for indefinite period from Feb. 7, 1914; stipulated payment $1 per train-mile.

Stanley and Gould; for freight trains; for indefinite period from May 13, 1917; stipulated payment 4½ cents per car-mile, with a minimum of $1.25 per train-mile.

Vandalia Railroad Company—Tracks, from

Gould to Walbridge, for freight service; for indefinite period from Mar. 1, 1915; stipulated payment 4½ cents per car-mile, with a minimum of $1.25 per train-mile.

The Detroit and Toledo Shore Line Railroad Company—This company uses all tracks of the carrier for switching purposes through arrangements made with the above-named companies, which perform all of the service incident to interchange of cars between The Detroit and Toledo Shore Line Company's tracks and tracks of the respective companies.
Solely owned, but not used, leased to—The Michigan Central Railroad Company—Land, at Toledo, for the construction of track for movement of locomotives and cars; for indefinite period from Jan. 1, 1915; stipulated payment $12 per annum.
Jointly used, but not owned, owned by—The Wheeling and Lake Erie Railway Company—Yard tracks and sidings, at Ironville, Toledo; term 99 years from May 23, 1916; stipulated payment equal to interest at 2½ per cent per annum on valuaution of $30,592.93, plus one-half the cost of maintenance and taxes.

There are other facilities of minor importance, such as interlockers, yard tracks, and sidings, in which the carrier grants or receives joint use, that are not listed in this chapter.

References

Railway companies established in 1907
Defunct Ohio railroads
Switching and terminal railroads